Ravdangiin Dechinmaa (born 19 February 1971) is a Mongolian judoka. She competed in the women's half-lightweight event at the 1992 Summer Olympics.

References

External links
 
 

1971 births
Living people
Mongolian female judoka
Olympic judoka of Mongolia
Judoka at the 1992 Summer Olympics
Place of birth missing (living people)
20th-century Mongolian women